Brandegee is a surname. Notable people with the surname include:

Augustus Brandegee (1828–1904), American lawyer and politician 
Frank B. Brandegee (1864–1924), American politician
Mary Katharine Brandegee (1844–1920), American botanist
Townshend Stith Brandegee (1843–1925), American botanist

See also 
Brandegee Estate, a historic estate in Massachusetts